Dimethyl selenide is the organoselenium compound with the formula (CH3)2Se.  This colorless, malodorous, liquid is the simplest selenoether. It occurs in trace amounts in anaerobic environments. 

Dimethyl selenide is prepared by treating Se2- sources with electrophilic methylating agents such as methyl iodide:
Na2Se  +  2 CH3I   →   (CH3)2Se  +  2 NaI

References

Organoselenium compounds
Selenium(−II) compounds
Selenoethers
Foul-smelling chemicals